Sri Lanka at the 2019 Military World Games claimed 3 medals as of 25 October 2019 in track and field events. Sri Lanka competed at the 2019 Military World Games in Wuhan from 18 to 27 October 2019. Sri Lanka sent a delegation consisting of athletes for the event.

Medal summary

Medal by sports

Medalists

References 

Nations at the 2019 Military World Games
2019 in Sri Lankan sport